The Palais Wilson (Wilson Palace) in Geneva, Switzerland, is the current headquarters of the Office of the United Nations High Commissioner for Human Rights. It was also the headquarters of the League of Nations from 1 November 1920 until that body moved its premises to the Palais des Nations on 17 February 1936, which was constructed between 1929 and 1938, also in Geneva. In 1924, the building was named after  U.S. President Woodrow Wilson, who was instrumental to the foundation of the League of Nations. The treaty bodies also hold their sessions in the Palais Wilson. In 1932, a glass annex was built to host the 1932 Conference on Disarmament. The Secretariat of the International Bureau of Education occupied the building from 1937 to 1984. The annex was destroyed in a fire in 1987.

The building, located on the western side of Lake Geneva, is one of the most prominent on the waterfront. The five-story and 225-room building by Lake Geneva was originally constructed in 1873–75 as Hôtel National. When Switzerland joined the then newly created League of Nations in 1920, the premises became the world body's headquarters.

References

United Nations High Commissioner for Human Rights - Headquarters

Buildings and structures in Geneva
United Nations properties
Woodrow Wilson
Buildings and structures completed in 1920
Second Empire architecture
1920 establishments in Switzerland
Switzerland and the United Nations
Buildings and monuments honoring American presidents
League of Nations
20th-century architecture in Switzerland